Wil Harris (born 20 September 1982) is a British digital media entrepreneur based in London.

In 2017, he became the co-founder and CEO of Entale Media, a podcasting platform backed by Founders Factory. Entale was subsequently backed by DMG Ventures in 2019 and fully acquired by the group in 2022. During that time, Entale won multiple awards for its innovation in the podcast space, including a Webby Award for Best Visual Design in an app.

He currently serves as Chairman of award-winning challenger creative agency Hotwolf.

He was formerly Head of Digital for Condé Nast UK, where he drove digital growth and innovation at the esteemed group, including the launch of new video and programmatic ventures.

In 2007 he founded, with Justin Gayner, the YouTube Multi-Channel Network ChannelFlip. After securing landmark deals to produce content with talent including David Mitchell and Ricky Gervais, ChannelFlip was successfully acquired by Elizabeth Murdoch 's Shine TV in 2012.

He is the former co-founder and editor in chief of the bit-tech enthusiast website.

Wil is a regular guest and commentator on technology, having appeared on podcasts including This Week in Tech, DLC and has written for GQ BBC News Online, The Inquirer and The Register.

Harris holds a degree in Law from the University of Oxford.

References

Living people
Alumni of the University of Oxford
1982 births